For other places with this name, see Parkview School (disambiguation).

Parkview Arts and Science Magnet High School is a magnet school in Little Rock, Arkansas, United States that concentrates heavily on science and the arts. It is Arkansas' first and only interdistrict high school. Although administered by the Little Rock School District, Parkview may receive students from the Pulaski County Special School District and the North Little Rock School District. It is commonly referred to as Little Rock Parkview.

Little Rock Parkview teaches grades 9 through 12, and has an average enrollment of 1,120 students.

Athletics 
The Parkview High School mascot is the Patriot with red, white, and blue as the school colors.

For 2012–14, the Parkview Patriots compete in the 6A Classification administered by the Arkansas Activities Association within the 7A/6A Central Conference. The Patriots participate in baseball, basketball (boys/girls), bowling, cheer, cross country, dance, debate, football, golf (boys/girls), soccer (boys/girls), softball, swimming & diving (boys/girls), track & field (boys/girls), and volleyball.

 Football: The Patriots football team won three consecutive state football titles in 1977, 1978, and 1979.
 Basketball: Between 1977 and 2012, the boys basketball team has won twelve (12) state basketball championships. In 1988 and 1992, the boys basketball team won the Arkansas high school overall title when the state held a tournament of classification champions. In 2012, Parkview basketball teams won 6A state championships; the girls team won 50–31 over Russellville High School and the boys team won 69–65 in double overtime over Jonesboro High School.

Notable alumni
The following are notable people associated with Parkview High School. If the person was a Parkview High School student, the number in parentheses indicates the year of graduation; if the person was a faculty or staff member, that person's title and years of association are included:
 Jamaal Anderson (2004)—professional football player (NFL)
 David Auburn (1977)—playwright.
 John Irving Blume (aka Joe Bob Briggs) (1971)—actor; writer; movie critic; columnist.
 Kevin Brockmeier (1991)—novelist who wrote Brief History Of The Dead.
 Derek Fisher (1992)—professional basketball player and coach (NBA); 5x NBA champion.
 Keith Jackson (1984)—member of College Football Hall of Fame and former professional football player (NFL).
 Quincy Lewis (1995)—professional basketball player.
 Art Porter, Jr. (1979)—jazz saxophonist.
 Frank Scott Jr., politician
 Duane Washington (1982)—professional basketball player (NBA).

References

External links
 
Parkview at Little Rock School District website

1968 establishments in Arkansas
Educational institutions established in 1968
High schools in Little Rock, Arkansas
Magnet schools in Arkansas
Public high schools in Arkansas
Schools in the Little Rock School District
Schools of the performing arts in the United States